David Charles Gregg (March 14, 1891 – November 12, 1965), nicknamed "Highpockets", was a Major League Baseball pitcher who played for one season. He pitched an inning of one game for the Cleveland Naps during the 1913 Cleveland Naps season. He was the brother of teammate Vean Gregg.

External links

1891 births
1965 deaths
Cleveland Naps players
Major League Baseball pitchers
Baseball players from Washington (state)
Portland Beavers players
Spokane Indians players
People from Chehalis, Washington
People from Clarkston, Washington